Corn most often refers to maize, the yellow, large-grained crop native to the Americas.

It can also refer to the main cereal crop of a country or region:
 Wheat or barley in England and Wales
 Oats in Scotland and Ireland
 Maize in Australia and New Zealand 

Corn may also refer to:

Places
 Corn, Lot, France
 Corn, Oklahoma, United States

People 
 Corn (surname), and persons with the name
 Corn Griffin (1911–1973), American heavyweight boxer

Other uses
 Corn (color)
 Corn (film), a 2004 movie
 Corn (pathology), an ingrowing callus often on the foot
 Corn, a type of snow
Dracaena fragrans (cornstalk dracaena or happy plant), a flowering African shrub commonly kept as a house plant

See also
 Corne (disambiguation)
 Corny (disambiguation)
 Korn (disambiguation)
 Maize (disambiguation)
 Quorn (disambiguation)